Little Flat Creek is a stream in Barry County in the Ozarks of south-central Missouri. It is a tributary of Flat Creek.

The stream headwaters arise at   just east of Missouri Route 37 about 1.5 miles south of Purdy. The stream flows north-northeast about three miles past the east side of Purdy to the Macedonia Church. There it turns east and flows east to southeast for approximately five miles.

The Tom Town Historic District is located along Little Flat Creek.

References

Rivers of Barry County, Missouri
Rivers of Missouri